Khasan Inalbekovich Mamtov (born 28 April 1984) is a Russian former professional footballer. He played as a forward.

Club career
He made his professional debut in the Russian Second Division in 2002 for FC Nart Cherkessk.

He made his Russian Premier League debut for FC Anzhi Makhachkala on 15 July 2017 in a game against PFC CSKA Moscow, at the age of 33 and after 15 seasons on lower levels.

References

1984 births
People from Khabezsky District
Living people
Russian footballers
Association football forwards
FC Dynamo Stavropol players
FC Chernomorets Novorossiysk players
FC Ural Yekaterinburg players
FC Khimki players
FC SKA-Khabarovsk players
FC Tyumen players
FC Anzhi Makhachkala players
FC Orenburg players
FC Tambov players
Russian Premier League players
Russian First League players
Russian Second League players
FC Urozhay Krasnodar players
FC Mashuk-KMV Pyatigorsk players
Sportspeople from Karachay-Cherkessia